"Boyfriend" is a song recorded by American pop band Big Time Rush for their debut studio album BTR (2010). The song was produced by Lucas Secon and written by him and Wayne Hector. It features rap verses by American rapper Snoop Dogg. It was released as the album's second official single on February 8, 2011, and was solicited to mainstream radio on February 15, 2011, through Columbia Records.

The song "Boyfriend" was met with mixed reviews by music critics; some praised it as a catchy single while others called it unoriginal and safe. Critics, however, praised Snoop Dogg for adding flavor to the song with his verses. The song was, however, a moderately international success, charting in Austria, Germany, Mexico, Belgium and the United Kingdom as well as a host in other countries. In the United States, the song peaked at number seventy-two on the Billboard Hot 100 becoming their highest-charting single to date. And it later earned a gold certification in the US for sales of more than 500,000 sold downloads. In 2018, the song was ranked ninety-seventh by Billboard in their compilation of the 100 Greatest Boyband Songs of All Time.

Background and composition
"Boyfriend" was written and produced by Lucas Secon while Wayne Hector, credited as Wayne Anthony Hector, also provided  writing. In addition to writing and producing, Secon programmed and arranged the song while performing on drums and synthesizers. Recording sessions took place at Westlake Recording Studios in Los Angeles, California, headed by Rob Kinelski, and at Mux Music Studios in London, England, headed by Secon and Pete Hoffman, both of which mixed the song. Editing through ProTools was done by Hoffman. Mintman performed on the guitars, bass and keys, which was recorded at the Westlake Recording Studios. "Boyfriend" was released as Big Time Rush's second single on February 8, when the remix featuring Snoop Dogg was released through digital distribution. A week later, Columbia Records serviced it to contemporary hit radio and the version featuring the New Boyz to rhythmic crossover in the United States. On April 19, 2011, a new version of the song featuring the New Boyz was released for digital distribution.

"Boyfriend" features the use of monochromatic beats, condensed instrument sounds, layered and tuned vocals and autotune. According to the digital music sheet published at Musicnotes.com by Sony/ATV Music Publishing, the song is composed in a key of E major. It is set in common time and has a moderate 4 tempo of 80 beats per minute. The band's vocals range from E3 to B5. It begins with a basic sequence of A-E-F#m-E and transitions to F#m-G#m-C#m as it chord progression. The single versions feature rap verses from Snoop Dogg and the New Boyz. The lyrics pertain to being the ideal boyfriend for someone, indicated in lines like, "I don't care at all what you've done before, all I really want is to be your boyfriend."

Reception

Critical response
"Boyfriend" received a generally mixed response from contemporary music critics. Matt Collar of AllMusic called the "head-bobbin'" tune one of the album's highlights. Jessica Dawson of Common Sense Media called the song a "catchy single" that "lingers in your head, with the boys pouting, "B-b-boy-boy-boy-boy-boyfriend," and the tune's easy, hip-pop rhythm." Dawson also commented, " No doubt fans will be wishing the guys were singing to them", awarding the song a three star rating. Caroline Sullivan of The Guardian praised Snoop Dogg's verses, commenting that they add "pizzazz" to "an otherwise anodyne dance-pop tune." Alistair McGeorge of Female First called it a "safe, by-the-numbers pop track that heavily relies on over-production and autotone." Brandon Soderberg of Popdust gave "Boyfriend" a three star rating, commending Snoop Dogg for providing a contrast to the "oddball charm" he presents on his guest features on pop songs. Soderberg credited Snoop Dogg for "inject[ing] specificity into an otherwise pretty ordinary song" and further praised his verses for their placement, writing that they provide "a crucially rewarding sense of narrative."

Chart performance
In the United States, "Boyfriend" entered the Billboard Hot 100 at number seventy-nine in the issue dated March 12, 2011. The song ascended and descended on the chart for several weeks before reaching its peak at number seventy-two in the issue dated May 7, 2011. "Boyfriend" shipped over 500,000 copies in the United States, earning a gold certification by the Recording Industry Association of America (RIAA). It also peaked at number thirty-two on the Pop Songs chart and at number fifty-eight on Hot Digital Songs. Across Europe, "Boyfriend" fared better on the charts. In Austria, the song peaked at number fifty-five on the singles chart. In Germany, the song debuted at number fifty-one and rose to number forty-nine in the next week.

Music video
The video features with Snoop Dogg living in the year 2099, and inviting Big Time Rush from the present to perform and join a party from a portal. At the party, Kendall is drinking a futuristic drink with a girl, James is dancing with two girls outside, Logan is floating around with a girl outside on a light board, and Carlos is dancing with another girl. Solo shots of the boys performing the song and scenes of the entire group performing the song on a stage is intercut throughout the video. After Snoop Dogg performs his verse, he later waves good-bye and the group exit out of the portal into 2011.

Track listing

Digital download
"Boyfriend" (feat. Snoop Dogg) – 3:35

UK maxi single
"Boyfriend" (featuring Snoop Dogg) – 3:35
"Boyfriend" (Jump Smokers remix radio edit featuring Snoop Dogg) – 3:07
"Boyfriend" – 3:21
"Boyfriend" (Video) – 3:41

EU CD single
"Boyfriend" (featuring Snoop Dogg) – 3:35
"Boyfriend" – 3:21

EU digital download
"Boyfriend" (featuring Snoop Dogg) – 3:35
"Boyfriend" – 3:21
"Boyfriend" (Video) – 3:41

UK remix EP
"Boyfriend" (Jump Smokers remix radio edit featuring Snoop Dogg) – 3:07
"Boyfriend" (Jump Smokers remix radio edit) – 2:52
"Boyfriend" (Jump Smokers remix extended version featuring Snoop Dogg) – 3:33

Credits
 Lucas Secon – songwriting, production, arrangement, programming, recording engineer, drums, synths, mixing
 Recorded at Mux Music Studios in London, England
 Wayne Anthony Hector – songwriting
 Rob Kinelski – recording engineer
 Recorded at Westlake Recording Studios in Los Angeles, California
 Pete Hoffman – recording engineer, ProTools editing, mixing
 Recorded at Mux Music Studios in London, England
 Mintman – additional guitars, bass, keys
 Instruments recorded at Westlake Recording Studios in Los Angeles, California
Credits adapted from BTR liner notes, Columbia Records.

Charts

Weekly charts

Year-end charts

Certifications

Release history

References

External links
 Page for the song on the official Big Time Rush site

2011 singles
Big Time Rush songs
Snoop Dogg songs
Songs written by Lucas Secon
2011 songs
Columbia Records singles
Songs written by Wayne Hector